This is a list of museums in Laos.

 Champasak Provincial Museum
 Haw Phra Kaew
 Kaysone Phomvihane Museum
 Lao National Museum
 Luang Namtha Museum
 Royal Palace, Luang Prabang

See also 

 List of museums

Museums
 
Laos
Museums
Museums
Laos